Barry Pickering (born 12 December 1956) was a successful association football player who represented New Zealand internationally, being part of the 1982 squad that participated at 1982 FIFA World Cup finals where he was the third choice goalkeeper behind Frank van Hattum and Richard Wilson.

Pickering made his full All Whites international debut in a 2-0 win over Singapore on 1 October 1978, and was a member of the squad that qualified for the 1982 FIFA World Cup finals in Spain but did not make the field in Spain. Including friendlies and unofficial games against club sides, Pickering played 20 times for New Zealand, ending his international playing career with 11 official A-international caps to his credit, keeping a clean sheet in his final appearance, a 2-0 win over Malaysia on 31 March 1984.

References

External links
 

1956 births
Living people
New Zealand association footballers
1982 FIFA World Cup players
New Zealand international footballers
Association football goalkeepers
Stop Out players